The manga adaption of Fuyumi Ono's horror novel Shiki was drawn and written by Ryu Fujisaki, and serialized by Shueisha in Jump Square. The story is about a small Japanese village named Sotoba, which is plagued by bizarre deaths caused by what seemed to be an epidemic. However, when Toshio Ozaki, the hospital dean, performs his own investigations, he discovers vampires, known as "Shiki" ("Corpse Demon" in English) living in their midst.

The first chapter was released in December 2007, and it was serialized in Jump Square until June 2011. A collected edition was released in 11 volumes.  A French edition was published in 2010 by Kazé Manga. A German edition was published in 2014 by Egmont Manga. An English edition has not been produced.

Volume list

References

External links
Official Shueisha site for the Shiki manga 

Shiki